Fateh-313 ("Conqueror-313"), an Iranian solid-fuel short-range ballistic missile, was unveiled on 21 August 2015. The Fateh-313 missile is the newest model within the Fateh missiles family. It is almost identical to the previous generation, the Fateh-110, but utilizes a new composite fuel and body. These changes increased the range to 500 km, from the Fateh-110's 300 km. Iran’s Defense Ministry plans to mass produce the missile.

See also 
 Military of Iran
 Iranian military industry
 List of military equipment manufactured in Iran
 Iran's missile forces
 Fateh-110
 Zolfaghar (missile)
 Science and technology in Iran
 Iranian underground missile bases
 Shahab-3
 Shahab-4
 Emad (missile)
 Valfajr (torpedo)

References

External links 
CSIS Missile Threat - Fateh-313

Ballistic missiles of Iran
Short-range ballistic missiles of Iran
Surface-to-surface missiles of Iran
Theatre ballistic missiles